The 2014 Catalunya GP3 Series round was a GP3 Series motor race held on May 10 and 11, 2014 at Circuit de Catalunya, Montmeló, Spain. It was the first round of the 2014 GP3 Series. The race supported the 2014 Spanish Grand Prix.

Classification

Qualifying

Feature Race

Sprint Race

See also 
 2014 Spanish Grand Prix
 2014 Catalunya GP2 Series round

References

External links
 

2014 GP3 round reports
2014 in Spanish motorsport